Sant' Andrea degli Scozzesi (English: St Andrew of the Scots) is a former Catholic church in Rome, near Piazza Barberini on Via delle Quattro Fontane. Once a haven for Scottish Catholics in Rome, it was deconsecrated in 1962 and still stands.

History
The church was built under Pope Clement VIII in 1592 with the title S.Andrea e S.Margherita regina. It was constructed for the Scottish expatriate community in Rome, especially for those intended for priesthood. The adjoining hospice was a shelter for Catholic Scots who escaped their country because of religious persecution. In 1615, Pope Paul V gave the hospice and the nearby Scots College to the Jesuits. It was rebuilt in 1645. They became more important when James Francis Edward Stuart, the Old Pretender, set his residence in Rome in 1717. It was abandoned during the French occupation of Rome in the late 18th century. In 1820, religious activity was resumed, but no longer by the Jesuits. It was reconstructed in 1869 by Luigi Poletti. The church was deconsecrated in 1962 and incorporated into a bank (Cassa di Risparmio delle Province Lombarde). The Scottish Seminary, the Pontificio Collegio Scozzese (Scots College, Rome), also moved away, to a new site on the Via Cassia. The Feast of St Andrew is still celebrated here on 30 November.

Art
The simple two-storied Baroque façade is only decorated with the cross and two fishes of Saint Andrew, the patron saint of Scotland. The former Scottish Seminary is still decorated with the coat of arms and motto of the country.

The interior of the church was left intact after 1962.

It has two aisles, side altars and barrel-vaulted ceiling. In the centre of the ceiling is a 16th-century fresco of St Andrew in Glory.

The high altar was made in the 17th century. The altarpiece from the 18th century is by Scottish painter Gavin Hamilton, and depicts the Martyrdom of St Andrew. There is also an Enthroned Madonna with Sts Columba and Ninian by Alexander Maximilian Seitz.

On both sides of the sanctuary there are hinged grates covering openings into tribunes where members of the exiled royal family would sit when they attended Mass.

See also
St Andrew's Church, Rome (Church of Scotland) 
The Scots College (Rome)

External links

Roman Catholic churches completed in 1592
Andrea
Religious organizations established in the 1590s
Andrea
Catholic organizations established in the 16th century
16th-century Roman Catholic church buildings in Italy
Andrea degli Scozzesi
Andrea degli Scozzesi